The Imathia Football Clubs Association (IMFCA) (Ένωση Ποδοσφαιρικών Σωματείων Ημαθίας, ΕΠΣHΜ = Enosi Podosfairikon Somateion Imathias, EPSIP) is a football (soccer) organization in the Imathia regional unit that is part of the Greek Football Federation.

It was founded in 1995 and its main headquarters are in the city of Veria.

External links
  Official website 

Imathia
Association football governing bodies in Greece